Neocladia may refer to:
 Neocladia (sponge), a sponge genus in the order Poecilosclerida
 Neocladia (wasp), a wasp genus in the subfamily Encyrtinae